Gail Katz is a film, television, and theatrical producer.

Career
Katz began her career at New World Pictures. In 1991, she produced her first film entitled, Shattered. Katz is currently a professor at the USC School of Cinematic Arts.

Filmography

Television

References

External links 
An article from the Yale Herald about Gail Katz
News Release on Lessons, a play by Katz

American film producers
American television producers
American women television producers
American theatre managers and producers
American women chief executives
Living people
University of California, Berkeley alumni
Yale School of Management alumni
American women film producers
American Jews
Year of birth missing (living people)
21st-century American women